Jitka Klimková (born 20 August 1974) is a football coach and former football player from the Czech Republic. In September 2021 she was appointed head coach of the Football Ferns, the New Zealand women's national football team.

Biography 
During her playing career she played for Sokol Čejč, Slávia Holíč and Compex Otrokovice in the Czech First Division. She was briefly a member of the Czech national team, playing as a defender.

She has coached the United States women's under-20 team, United States women's under-19 team, Canberra United in Australia's W-League, 1.FC Slovácko, the Czech Republic women's team and Internationals Soccer Club in Ohio, USA. In Australia, she was named Coach of the Year in the W-League in 2011-12. In New Zealand, she has coached the national under-17 women’s team, including their campaign at the FIFA 2014 Under-17 Women's World Cup, and has also worked as an assistant coach with the Under-20s and the Football Ferns.

Klimková is the first woman appointed to coach the Football Ferns on a full-time basis.

References

1974 births
Living people
Czech women's footballers
Czech Republic women's international footballers
Czech football managers
Czech expatriate sportspeople in Australia
Expatriate soccer managers in Australia
A-League Women managers
Expatriate association football managers in New Zealand
Expatriate soccer managers in the United States
Czech expatriate sportspeople in the United States
People from Kyjov
Women's association football defenders
1. FC Slovácko (women) players
Czech Women's First League players
Czech expatriate football managers
Sportspeople from the South Moravian Region
New Zealand women's national football team managers